Phillip "Fish" Cockrell, born Philip Cockrell Williams, (July 9, 1895 – March 31, 1951) was a baseball player in the Negro leagues.

Cockrell started his career as a top-level Negro league pitcher in 1917, playing for both with the Lincoln Giants and Hilldale. He pitched for Hilldale from then until the team's demise in 1932.

He was pitcher and outfielder from 1917 to 1934.

Cockrell was the first pitcher to pitch in the first Colored World Series. Game One of the Colored World Series occurred on October 3, 1924 at the Baker Bowl in Philadelphia, Pennsylvania.

Cockrell was also the first Negro league pitcher to pitch at historic Hinchliffe Stadium in Paterson, New Jersey. He started the first game of a doubleheader between the Paterson Pros and the Bacharach Giants on August 14, 1932. While with Hilldale he formed a close friendship with teammate George Washington "Dibo" Johnson that extended beyond the baseball diamond, and he and Johnson roomed together after their playing careers ended.

He lived in Philadelphia after his retirement as a player, rooming with former teammate George Johnson. After Dibo Johnson died, Cockrell led a fundraiser to get money for a memorial tablet for his grave.

Cockrell was murdered in 1951 when he was shot by a jealous husband in a case of mistaken identity as he walked out of a Philadelphia, Pennsylvania bar. He is buried at Mount Lawn Cemetery, Sharon Hill, Delaware County, Pennsylvania, USA.

One year after his death, Cockrell received votes listing him on the 1952 Pittsburgh Courier player-voted poll of the Negro leagues' best players ever.

References

External links
 and Baseball-Reference Black Baseball stats and Seamheads
 

1895 births
1951 deaths
Bacharach Giants players
Brooklyn Royal Giants players
Hilldale Club players
Lincoln Giants players
Philadelphia Stars players
Baseball players from Augusta, Georgia
Negro league baseball managers
20th-century African-American sportspeople
Deaths by firearm in Pennsylvania
People murdered in Pennsylvania
Burials in Pennsylvania